Julius Francis (born 8 December 1964) is a British former professional boxer who participated in many noteworthy boxing matches in the mid 90s and 2000s. In 2007, he also participated in a mixed martial arts bout, having been a former European heavyweight kickboxing champion.

Boxing career

Early career
After a troubled youth that saw him spend several spells in prison, Francis turned pro in 1993 at the late age of 28 with a five-round knockout of Graham Arnold. He put together six wins (3 by knockout), including two in the US, before being matched, somewhat prematurely, with future world heavyweight champion John Ruiz. Francis was stopped in 4 rounds by body shots.

In 1995 Francis won Southern Area title fights against Damien Caesar and Keith Fletcher. However, he squandered a big opportunity in an eliminator, when far ahead on points after nine rounds, hard hitting Scott Welch came from behind to drop him three times and stop him in 10. After this fight, Welch would go on to win the British title and challenge for a world title, while Francis was dropped by his team and relegated to journeyman status.

Later in 1995, he took a fight in Russia and was outpointed by local Nikolai Kulpin and, in London, lost a debatable decision by half a point to veteran Michael Murray.

Francis showed marked improvement in 1996, knocking out ex-victim Caesar in the first round to regain his Southern Area title, outpointing Michael Holden, and scoring the biggest win of his career to date as he took on hard hitting "Big Bad" James Oyebola and destroyed the giant Nigerian in 5 one sided rounds.

The big win over Oyebola got Francis a February 1997 shot at Zeljko Mavrovic for his European title, on the champion's home turf of Austria. Francis "stole" Mavrovic's bizarre mohawk haircut for the fight and even dyed it blonde. In the fight itself, Francis strangely took a knee from body shots in the 8th and watched the ref wave the fight off.

Experienced pro
In June, Francis was back, outpointing the hard hitting Zambian Joseph Chingangu in London for the Commonwealth title, and in September retained his Commonwealth title and won the vacant British title with a 6th-round knockout of Garry Delaney in Northern Ireland.

His manager Frank Maloney was unsuccessful in attempting to move Francis up in 1998, as he was outpointed in Germany by local icon Axel Schulz in a European title eliminator, and a second visit to German shores saw him decked three times and stopped in the second round by giant Ukrainian Vitali Klitschko. Klitschko would go on to win the World Heavyweight title.

In 1999, Francis was back and enjoyed the best form of his career. In January, he defended his British and Commonwealth titles against the flamboyant, hard hitting and highly rated prospect Pelé Reid, who was 13-0 (13 knockouts) and favoured to beat Francis. Francis took Reid apart in 3 one-sided rounds.

In April, he was again the underdog as he defended against another highly rated prospect, this time Frank Warren's undefeated Danny Williams, who was 15-0 (12 knockouts). Francis used all his smarts to widely outpoint the "Brixton Bomber". This win gave Francis the coveted Lonsdale Belt outright as he had now won three British title fights.

In June, he enjoyed the sweetest victory of his career as he outpointed former conqueror Scott Welch who was 22-3 (17 knockouts). He would vacate his Commonwealth title later in the year to set up the biggest fight of his career. At the age of 35, Francis got a shot at visiting iconic ex-champ Mike Tyson, in Manchester in January 2000. Francis was decked five times and lost in two rounds, although enjoyed the biggest payday of his career (around £350,000). The certainty of his defeat can be gauged by the fact that The Mirror, a national newspaper in the UK, had paid £20,000 for an advert on the soles of Francis's shoes. Less than two months later, a disinterested Francis was back in the ring and lost his British title on a close decision to Michael Holden, whom he had already beaten. Holden would later vacate the title due to injury.

In 2001, Francis returned to complete his trilogy with Holden, outpointing him over 12 rounds, and setting up a July rematch with Danny Williams, who was now #1 in the UK, world rated, and held the British and Commonwealth titles. Francis failed to repeat his earlier win, losing in the 4th round due to a swollen eye.

He would resurface in September 2002 in Denmark, scoring an upset over undefeated Steffen Nielsen, who he knocked out in 6. This earned him a European title shot in Germany against the Turk Sinan Samil Sam, who had just crushed Danny Williams in 6 rounds. Francis appeared to make little effort, quitting in the 7th round from body shots.

In early 2009, he began a new career with Fightfit Training a UK-based fitness training company as a Personal trainer/Boxing coach teaching city professionals the art of boxing.

Downward slide
Francis was now 38 years old and with a respectable record of 23-10-1 (12 knockouts).

He would mix in with high class company in the UK, Germany, Russia, and other locations, but he would not win another fight. The most notable fights were a November 2003 second-round KO loss to future champ Oleg Maskaev (26-5), a February 2004 decision loss to fast rising Matt Skelton (11-0), and a May 2004 decision loss to Olympic Champion Audley Harrison (15-0).

Francis appeared to have reached the end of the road in May 2006, when he was outpointed over 4 rounds by unknown Scott Lansdowne. He was 41 years old and weighed well over 19 stone. Having lost 14 fights in a row, his record now stood at 23-24-1 (12 knockouts).

Overall, Francis has won four British Heavyweight title fights and five Commonwealth title fights, as well as two challenges for the European title and he has fought four former or future World champions, besides owning his very own much heralded Lonsdale Belt.

Life after boxing

Mixed Martial Arts career
In the summer of 2007, Francis announced that at Cage Rage 23: Unbelievable on 22 September 2007 he would be making his mixed martial arts debut against Gary Turner. Francis stated that he expected the move to mixed martial arts to be comfortable for him as he was already a good kickboxer before he took up boxing. His opponent Gary Turner was previously beaten by Matt Skelton, one of Francis's own conquerors, in a K-1 tournament in 2000.

Francis lost his MMA bout against Turner by TKO (submission to punches) at 2:15 in round 2.

Other activities
In 2012, Francis starred in the stage play Ring Envy, a modern version of Shakespeare's Othello in London, his performance earning praise from the likes of Sylvia Syms.

In June 2022, whilst working at a gig as security at Boxpark Wembley, Francis went viral for knocking out a man who was acting aggressively to numerous members of the public. Roger Wade, the founder and CEO of Boxpark, was quick to defend Julius after it was revealed that the man had been acting aggressively for up to 15 minutes before Julius punched him. Other employees of Boxpark also spoke to the press in support of Julius, praising his character. The viral video showed the man in question pushing several members of staff and attempting, unsuccessfully, to punch both patrons and members of security. In the moments before Julius knocked the man unconscious, the man could be seen approaching Julius, shouting and raising his fist. The metropolitan police reviewed the video in question, but ultimately concluded that Julius had acted reasonably and legally.

Professional boxing record

| style="text-align:center;" colspan="8"|23 Wins (12 knockouts, 11 decisions), 24 Losses (8 knockouts, 16 decisions), 1 Draws
|-  style="text-align:center; background:#e3e3e3;"
|  style="border-style:none none solid solid; "|Res.
|  style="border-style:none none solid solid; "|Record
|  style="border-style:none none solid solid; "|Opponent
|  style="border-style:none none solid solid; "|Type
|  style="border-style:none none solid solid; "|Rd.
|  style="border-style:none none solid solid; "|Date
|  style="border-style:none none solid solid; "|Location
|  style="border-style:none none solid solid; "|Notes
|- align=center
|Loss
|23–24–1
|align=left| Scott Lansdowne
|
|
|
|align=left|
|align=left|
|- align=center
|Loss
|23–23–1
|align=left| Scott Gammer
|
|
|
|align=left|
|align=left|
|- align=center
|Loss
|23–22–1
|align=left| Colin Kenna
|
|
|
|align=left|
|align=left|
|- align=center
|Loss
|23–21–1
|align=left| Micky Steeds
|
|
|
|align=left|
|align=left|
|- align=center
|Loss
|23–20–1
|align=left| Roman Greenberg
|
|
|
|align=left|
|align=left|
|- align=center
|Loss
|23–19–1
|align=left| Taras Bydenko
|
|
|
|align=left|
|align=left|
|- align=center
|Loss
|23–18–1
|align=left| Alexander Dimitrenko
|
|
|
|align=left|
|align=left|
|- align=center
|Loss
|23–17–1
|align=left| Audley Harrison
|
|
|
|align=left|
|align=left| 
|- align=center
|Loss
|23–16–1
|align=left| Matt Skelton
|
|
|
|align=left|
|align=left| 
|- align=center
|Loss
|23–15–1
|align=left| Oleg Maskaev
|
|
|
|align=left|
|align=left|
|- align=center
|Loss
|23–14–1
|align=left| Luan Krasniqi
|
|
|
|align=left|
|align=left|
|- align=center
|Loss
|23–13–1
|align=left| Volodymyr Vyrchys
|
|
|
|align=left|
|align=left|
|- align=center
|Loss
|23–12–1
|align=left| Steffen Nielsen
|
|
|
|align=left|
|align=left| 
|- align=center
|Loss
|23–11–1
|align=left| Sinan Samil Sam
|
|
|
|align=left|
|align=left| 
|- align=center
|Win
|23–10–1
|align=left| Steffen Nielsen
|
|
|
|align=left|
|align=left|
|- align=center
|style="background:#abcdef;"|Draw
|22–10–1
|align=left| Luke Simpkin
|
|
|
|align=left|
|align=left|
|- align=center
|Loss
|22–10
|align=left| Danny Williams
|
|
|
|align=left|
|align=left| 
|- align=center
|Win
|22–9
|align=left| Mike Holden
|
|
|
|align=left|
|align=left|
|- align=center
|Loss
|21–9
|align=left| Mike Holden
|
|
|
|align=left|
|align=left|
|- align=center
|Loss
|21–8
|align=left| Mike Tyson
|
|
|
|align=left|
|align=left|
|- align=center
|Win
|21–7
|align=left| Scott Welch
|
|
|
|align=left|
|align=left|
|- align=center
|Win
|20–7
|align=left| Danny Williams
|
|
|
|align=left|
|align=left|
|- align=center
|Win
|19–7
|align=left| Pelé Reid
|
|
|
|align=left|
|align=left|
|- align=center
|Loss
|18–7
|align=left| Vitali Klitschko
|
|
|
|align=left|
|align=left|
|- align=center
|Loss
|18–6
|align=left| Axel Schulz
|
|
|
|align=left|
|align=left|
|- align=center
|Win
|18–5
|align=left| Garry Delaney
|
|
|
|align=left|
|align=left|
|- align=center
|Win
|17–5
|align=left| Joseph Chingangu
|
|
|
|align=left|
|align=left|
|- align=center
|Loss
|16–5
|align=left| Željko Mavrović
|
|
|
|align=left| Kurhalle Oberlaa, Vienna
|align=left|
|- align=center
|Win
|16–4
|align=left| James Oyebola
|
|
|
|align=left|
|align=left|
|- align=center
|Win
|15–4
|align=left| Michael Holden
|
|
|
|align=left|
|align=left| 
|- align=center
|Win
|14–4
|align=left| Darren Fearn
|
|
|
|align=left|
|align=left|
|- align=center
|Win
|13–4
|align=left| Damien Caesar
|
|
|
|align=left|
|align=left|
|- align=center
|Loss
|12–4
|align=left| Michael Murray
|
|
|
|align=left|
|align=left|
|- align=center
|Loss
|12–3
|align=left| Nikolay Kulpin
|
|
|
|align=left|
|align=left| 
|- align=center
|Win
|12–2
|align=left| Neil Kirkwood
|
|
|
|align=left|
|align=left| 
|- align=center
|Loss
|11–2
|align=left| Scott Welch
|
|
|
|align=left|
|align=left|
|- align=center
|Win
|11–1
|align=left| Steve Garber
|
|
|
|align=left|
|align=left|
|- align=center
|Win
|10–1
|align=left| Keith Fletcher
|
|
|
|align=left|
|align=left|
|- align=center
|Win
|9–1
|align=left| Damien Caesar
|
|
|
|align=left|
|align=left|
|- align=center
|Win
|8–1
|align=left| Gary Charlton
|
|
|
|align=left|
|align=left|
|- align=center
|Win
|7–1
|align=left| Conroy Nelson
|
|
|
|align=left|
|align=left|
|- align=center
|Loss
|6–1
|align=left| John Ruiz
|
|
|
|align=left|
|align=left|
|- align=center
|Win
|6–0
|align=left| Manny Burgo
|
|
|
|align=left|
|align=left|
|- align=center
|Win
|5–0
|align=left| John Keeton
|
|
|
|align=left|
|align=left|
|- align=center
|Win
|4–0
|align=left| Don Sargent
|
|
|
|align=left|
|align=left|
|- align=center
|Win
|3–0
|align=left| Andre Tisdale
|
|
|
|align=left|
|align=left|
|- align=center
|Win
|2–0
|align=left| Joey Paladino
|
|
|
|align=left|
|align=left|
|- align=center
|Win
|1–0
|align=left| Graham Arnold
|
|
|
|align=left|
|align=left|

Mixed martial arts record

|-
| Loss
| align=center| 0–1
| Gary Turner
| TKO (submission to punches)
| Cage Rage 23
| 
| align=center| 2
| align=center| 2:17
| Wembley, London
|

References

External links
 
 

1964 births
Living people
English male boxers
Heavyweight boxers
English male mixed martial artists
Heavyweight mixed martial artists
Mixed martial artists utilizing boxing
People from Peckham
Boxers from Greater London